Roney is a surname. Notable people with the surname include:

Antoine Roney (born 1963), American jazz tenor and soprano saxophonist
Blake Roney (born 1958), founder and chairman of Nu Skin Enterprises
Leonidas Roney, grandfather of late television and radio writer Andy Rooney
Marimba Roney (born 1976), Swedish journalist and television host
Matt Roney (born 1980), Major League Baseball right-handed pitcher
Michael Roney (born 1954), American businessman
Paul Hitch Roney (1921–2006), American federal judge
Peter Roney (1887–1930), professional footballer
Roney "Giah" Giacometti (born 1974), Brazilian composer, singer, guitar player and producer
Shanti Roney (born 1970), Swedish actor
Wallace Roney (1960–2020), American hard bop and post-bop trumpeter

See also
Roneys Point, West Virginia
Stone Tavern at Roney's Point
Rooney (disambiguation)